"A Woman in Love" is a song written by Curtis Wright and Doug Millett, and recorded by American country music singer Ronnie Milsap.  It was released in September 1989 as the third single from the album Stranger Things Have Happened.  It was his last song to reach number one on the U.S. country singles chart.

Content
The song tells the story of a man who is confused with the way women in love behave. For an example, during the chorus, Ronnie sings the following line: "You never know with a woman in love."

Success and reception 
"A Woman in Love" was Milsap's 53rd single to be released and the third track from the album Stranger Things Have Happened, the song became his last number-one single, which was accompanied by a music video for the song.

Curtis Wright, who had just quit Vern Gosdin's road band, wrote the song in 1989. He said that when Doug Millett presented him with the idea, he was initially uninterested in writing the song, but "it kind of opened up like a book". Wright was still concerned that its hook was too similar to Earl Thomas Conley's 1988 single "What She Is (Is a Woman in Love)", and thought that the song was not suited for Milsap's style.

Chart positions

Year-end charts

References

1989 singles
Ronnie Milsap songs
Songs written by Curtis Wright
Song recordings produced by Tom Collins (record producer)
RCA Records singles
Music videos directed by John Lloyd Miller
1989 songs